Chemiker Zeitung was a German scientific journal with publications on general and industrial chemistry. It was established in 1877, and it issued in Köthen. From 1932 onwards, it was named Forschrittsbericht der Chemiker-Zeitung über die wichtigsten Gebiete der Chemie und chemischen Industrie and in 1950 the name changed to Deutsche Chemiker-Zeitschrift. Publication was suspended between 1945-1949. The journal was continued from 1959 to 1968 as the Chemiker-Zeitung, Chemische Apparatur. In 1992, Chemiker Zeitung was merged with Journal für praktische Chemie (established in 1834). Since 2001, Advanced Synthesis & Catalysis (publisher: Wiley-VCH, Weinheim, Germany) integrated both Chemiker Zeitung and Journal für praktische Chemie.

See also
 Science and technology in Germany

References

External links
 Chemiker Zeitung 1885, 1887 - in PDF format with OCR. Technical University of Lodz Digital Library

Chemistry journals
Publications established in 1878
German-language journals
Wiley-VCH academic journals